Nicholls Colonels basketball may refer to either of the basketball teams that represent Nicholls State University:

Nicholls Colonels men's basketball
Nicholls Colonels women's basketball